The 1991 population census in Croatia was the last census of the population of Croatia taken before the Croatian War of Independence. It was conducted by the Croatian Bureau of Statistics during the final week of March 1991. For the 1991 census there were 106 municipalities of which five were part of Zagreb.

Population by ethnicity

TOTAL = 4,784,265 
Croats = 3,736,356 (78.1%)
Serbs = 581,663 (12.2%)
Yugoslavs = 106,041 (2.2%)
ethnic Muslims = 43,469 (0.9%)
Slovenes = 22,376 (0.5%)
Hungarians = 22,355 (0.5%)
Italians = 21,303 (0.4%)
Czechs = 13,086 (0.3%)
Albanians = 12,032 (0.3%)
Montenegrins = 9,724 (0.2%)
Romani = 6,695 (0.1%)
Macedonians = 6,280 (0.1%)
Slovaks = 6,606 (0.1%)
Rusyns 3,253 (0.1%)
Germans = 2,635 (0.1%)
Ukrainians = 2,494
Romanians = 810
Russians = 706
Poles = 679
Jews = 600
Bulgarians = 458
Turks = 320
Greeks = 281
Austrians = 214
Vlachs and Morlachs = 22
others = 3,012
unspecified = 73,376
regional affiliation = 45,493
unknown = 62,926

By municipality

References 
 

Croatia
Population
Demographic history of Croatia
Croatia